WCW/New Japan Supershow III (known as Fantastic Story in Tokyo Dome in Japan) took place on January 4, 1993, in the Tokyo Dome in Tokyo, Japan. The show would be the third and final show available on pay-per-view (PPV) in America under the name WCW/New Japan Supershow. In Japan it was promoted under the name "Fantastic Story in Tokyo Dome" and was the second annual NJPW January 4 Dome Show, NJPW's premier event of the year.

The US PPV broadcast originally advertised that they would show the eighth match of the show, an IWGP Tag Team Championship match with champions The Hell Raisers (Hawk Warrior and Power Warrior) defending the championship against WCW representatives The Steiner Brothers (Rick Steiner and Scott Steiner), but by the time the PPV was shown in the US the Steiner Brothers had informed WCW that they were leaving the company and thus the match was pulled from the show. Instead WCW chose to air the match with WAR's Koki Kitahara, Masao Orihara, and Nobukazu Hirai vs. NJPW's Akira Nogami, Takayuki Iizuka, and El Samurai.

The WCW/NJPW Supershows were a part of a small number of WCW-produced PPVs that were not included in the "on demand" features when the WWE Network was launched in 2014.

Storylines
The event featured ten professional wrestling matches and two pre-show matches that involved different wrestlers from pre-existing scripted feuds and storylines. Wrestlers portrayed villains, heroes, or less distinguishable characters in the scripted events that built tension and culminated in a wrestling match or series of matches.

Results

See also

1993 in professional wrestling

References

Events in Tokyo
January 1993 events in Asia
1993 World Championship Wrestling pay-per-view events
WCW/New Japan Supershow
January 4 Tokyo Dome Show
1993 in Tokyo